Sonja McCullen is an American judge, lawyer and former educator who currently serve as a judge of the Hawaii Intermediate Court of Appeals.

Education 
McCullen earned a Bachelor of Arts degree in liberal and Hawaiian studies from the University of Hawaiʻi at Mānoa and a Juris Doctor from the William S. Richardson School of Law.

Career 
From 1994 to 1997, McCullen worked as a teacher at Waianae High School. For over 10 years, she has served as a deputy prosecutor in the appellate division of the Department of the Prosecuting Attorney of the City and County of Honolulu. She was also a staff attorney for United Public Workers of America. In August 2021, McCullen was nominated to serve as a judge of the Hawaii Intermediate Court of Appeals.

References 

Living people
American lawyers
Hawaii lawyers
University of Hawaiʻi alumni
American prosecutors
Year of birth missing (living people)